Bass High School is a comprehensive, co-educational government high school in , a south-western suburb of Sydney, New South Wales, Australia.

Land history 
The school was established in 1959 and accepts students from feeder primary schools in Villawood, Bass Hill and Georges Hall.  Bass High School (usually abbreviated to "Bass High") caters for students in years 7 to 12.

It is named after George Bass, the explorer. The school is in the Bankstown District of the New South Wales Department of Education and Training. It is unique among government schools in this district as it has a farm and offers agriculture as a course of study.

Student body 
In the 1980s, a large percentage of the school's students were from Greek and Italian backgrounds.  During the 1990s, students from Asia and the Middle East were more common.  The multicultural nature of the school has meant that it has often promoted multicultural ideals and concepts.

The number of students attending the school has varied since it opened.  It started off with several hundred students and peaked during the late 1980s with over a thousand students.  Since that time the numbers attending have decreased.

See also 

 List of government schools in New South Wales
 Education in Australia

References

External links
Bass High School Website

Public high schools in Sydney
South Western Sydney
Educational institutions established in 1959
1959 establishments in Australia